WZVI (channel 21) is an independent television station serving the United States Virgin Islands that is licensed to Charlotte Amalie, Saint Thomas. The station is owned by Atlas News and Information Services, as part of a duopoly with Christiansted-licensed Ion Television affiliate WSVI (channel 8). The two stations share studios at the Sunny Isle Shopping Center in Christiansted; WZVI's transmitter is located on Flag Hill. WZVI serves as a secondary station for the Virgin Islands Television Network.

Digital channels

References

External links

Independent television stations in the United States
Television channels and stations established in 2004
2004 establishments in the United States Virgin Islands
ZVI